This is a list of symbols of the U.S. state of Maryland. The majority of the items in the list are officially recognized symbols created by an act of the Maryland General Assembly and signed into law by the governor. However, two of the more famous symbols of Maryland, the state motto and the state nicknames, were never made official by the state government. While the state seal derives from the colonial heritage of the state, the majority of official state symbols were designated in the last few decades.

Insignia

Species

Geology

Culture

References

General

Specific

State symbols
Maryland
Symbols of Maryland